Mohamed Abdoulwahab (also spelled Abdouloihabi) (born 31 December 1959) has been president of the autonomous island of Grande Comore in the Comoros since 30 June 2007.

A lawyer and veteran politician, he held several posts in previous national governments, including interior minister (October 1994-April 1995), foreign minister (April–September 1995), and justice minister (May–August 1996).

References

1959 births
Living people
People from Grande Comore
Foreign ministers of the Comoros
Interior ministers of the Comoros 
Justice ministers of the Comoros